Stara Wiśniewka  (before 1913: Polnisch Wisniewke) is a village in the administrative district of Gmina Zakrzewo, within Złotów County, Greater Poland Voivodeship, in west-central Poland.

Before 1945 the area was part of Germany. For more on its history, see Złotów County.

The village has a population of 567.

References

Stara Wiśniewka – Parafia pw. św. Marcina Biskupa – Diecezja Bydgoska

Villages in Złotów County